The 2019 BMW Open (also known as the BMW Open by FWU for sponsorship reasons) was a men's tennis tournament played on outdoor clay courts. It was the 104th edition of the event and part of the ATP Tour 250 series of the 2019 ATP Tour. It took place at the MTTC Iphitos complex in Munich, Germany, from 29 April until 5 May 2019.

Singles main draw entrants

Seeds

 Rankings are as of April 22, 2019.

Other entrants
The following players received wildcards into the main draw:
  Karen Khachanov
  Maximilian Marterer
  Rudolf Molleker

The following players received entry from the qualifying draw:
  Denis Istomin
  Yannick Maden
  Thiago Monteiro
  Lorenzo Sonego

Withdrawals
  Radu Albot → replaced by  Marius Copil

Doubles main draw entrants

Seeds

 Rankings are as of April 22, 2019.

Other entrants
The following pairs received wildcards into the doubles main draw:
  Matthias Bachinger /  Peter Gojowczyk
  Yannick Maden /  Maximilian Marterer

The following pairs received entry as alternates:
  Andre Begemann /  Rudolf Molleker

Withdrawals
Before the tournament
  Benoît Paire (Illness)

Champions

Singles

  Cristian Garín def.  Matteo Berrettini, 6–1, 3–6, 7–6(7–1)

Doubles

  Frederik Nielsen /  Tim Pütz def.  Marcelo Demoliner /  Divij Sharan, 6–4, 6–2

References

External links
Official website